Major-General Philip Middleton Davies  (born 27 October 1932) is a former British Army officer.

Military career
Educated at Charterhouse School and the Royal Military Academy Sandhurst, Davies was commissioned into the Royal Scots in 1953 and saw action during the Korean War before being deployed to the Suez Canal Zone. He became commanding officer of the 1st Battalion Royal Scots in 1973 and was deployed to Northern Ireland during the Troubles. He became commander of 19th Infantry Brigade in 1977, commander of Land Forces, Cyprus in 1981 and General Officer Commanding North West District in 1983 before retiring in 1986.

References

 

1932 births
Living people
British Army personnel of the Korean War
People educated at Charterhouse School
Graduates of the Royal Military Academy Sandhurst
British Army major generals
Royal Scots officers
Officers of the Order of the British Empire